{{Infobox newspaper
| name                = Diario Democracia
| logo                =
| caption             = Diario Democracia Office in Junin| image               = 
| type                = Daily newspaper
| format              =
| foundation          = 17 October 1931
| ceased publication  = 
| owners              =
| publisher           =
| editor              = 
| chiefeditor         = 
| assoceditor         = 
| maneditor           =
| staff               = 
| language            = Spanish
| political           = RadicalismSocial democracy
| circulation         =
| headquarters        = Junin, Argentina
| sister newspapers   =
| oclc                = 
| ISSN                = 
| website             = Diario Democracia }}Diario Democracia is a Spanish Language daily newspaper published from Junin, Buenos Aires Province, Argentina. It was founded in October 1931 by Moses Lebensohn.

References

External links
Diario Democracia 

1931 establishments in Argentina
Mass media in Buenos Aires
Daily newspapers published in Argentina
Publications established in 1931
Spanish-language newspapers